Water, Water, Everywhere is a 1920 American silent comedy film directed by Clarence G. Badger and written by Robert F. Hill. It is based on the 1912 novel Billy Fortune and the Hard Proposition by William Rheem Lighton. The film stars Will Rogers, Irene Rich, Rowland V. Lee, Wade Boteler, Margaret Livingston, and Milton Brown. The film was released on February 8, 1920, by Goldwyn Pictures.

Cast       
Will Rogers as Billy Fortune
Irene Rich as Hope Beecher
Rowland V. Lee as Arthur Gunther 
Wade Boteler as Ben Morgan
Margaret Livingston as Martha Beecher
Milton Brown as Sam Beecher
Victor Potel as Steve Brainard
William Courtright as Daddy Sammett
Sidney De Gray as Red McGee
Lillian Langdon as Fay Bittinger
Lydia Yeamans Titus as Mrs. Red McGee

References

External links

1920 films
1920s English-language films
Silent American comedy films
1920 comedy films
Goldwyn Pictures films
Films directed by Clarence G. Badger
American silent feature films
American black-and-white films
1920s American films